Russula sinuata is a fungus in the family, Russulaceae, found in eucalyptus forests in Tasmania (E. angophoroides, E. gummifera and E. maculata).

It was first described in 2007 by Teresa Lebel and Jennifer Tonkin.

References

sinuata
Taxa named by Teresa Lebel
Fungi described in 2007